Alexei Romanovich Maklyukov (born 19 September 1993) is a Kazakhstani ice hockey player for Metallurg Magnitogorsk and the Kazakhstani national team.

He represented Kazakhstan at the 2021 IIHF World Championship.

References

External links

1993 births
Living people
Barys Nur-Sultan players
Dynamo Balashikha players
Kazakhstani ice hockey defencemen
Metallurg Magnitogorsk players
People from Voskresensk